Live at Basin Street East is a live album by pianist Ray Bryant recorded at Basin Street East and released on Sue Records in 1964.

Reception 

The Allmusic review stated "This LP concentrates primarily on standards, although one pop song of the period (Bob Dylan's "Blowin' in the Wind") is thrown in, along with a pair of Bryant's originals. The piano is in decent shape, though Bryant is fairly conservative in his approach to most of the tunes, resulting in a somewhat uninspired treatment of "C Jam Blues" and a funky but lackluster "Love for Sale." ... The audience, for the most part, seems more interested in talking among themselves than realizing they are witnessing the making of a live recording".

Track listing 
All compositions by Ray Bryant except where noted
 "What Is This Thing Called Love?" (Cole Porter) – 3:40
 "C Jam Blues" (Barney Bigard, Duke Ellington) – 3:30
 "Sister Suzie" – 4:36
 "This Is All I Ask" (Gordon Jenkins) – 2:28
 "Love for Sale" (Porter) – 4:26
 "Blowin' in the Wind" (Bob Dylan) – 4:15
 "Satin Doll" (Ellington, Billy Strayhorn, Johnny Mercer) – 4:40
 "Days of Wine and Roses" )Henry Mancini, Johnny Mercer) – 4:07
 "Blue Azurte" (Wild Bill Davis) – 2:20
 "All the Young Ladies" – 3:17

Personnel 
Ray Bryant – piano
Jimmy Rowser – bass
Ben Riley – drums

References 

1964 live albums
Ray Bryant live albums
Sue Records live albums
Albums recorded at Basin Street East